Mark Alan Hamilton (born July 29, 1984) is an American former professional baseball first baseman. He played in Major League Baseball (MLB) for the St. Louis Cardinals. After his playing career, Hamilton pursued a medical degree and is currently a resident in interventional radiology at Long Island Jewish Medical Center.

Early and personal life
Hamilton was born on July 29, 1984, in Baltimore, Maryland. His father, Stanley Hamilton, was a doctor who served as the head of pathology and laboratory medicine at MD Anderson Cancer Center in Houston, Texas. After graduating from Episcopal High School in Bellaire, Texas, he attended Tulane University where he played college baseball for the Tulane Green Wave baseball team. In 2004 and 2005, he played collegiate summer baseball with the Falmouth Commodores of the Cape Cod Baseball League and was named a league all-star in 2005. In 2006, Hamilton was a first team All-American at Tulane despite a thumb injury which forced him to miss much of the 2005 season.

Professional career

Draft and minor leagues
Hamilton was selected by the Cardinals in the second round of the 2006 Major League Baseball Draft, which was a supplemental pick for loss of free agent infielder Abraham Núñez. He was added to the Cardinals' 40-man roster following the 2009 season to protect him from the Rule 5 Draft.

St. Louis Cardinals
On September 18, Hamilton's contract was purchased by the Cardinals and he was promoted to the major leagues. A year later after his debut, the Cardinals advanced to the postseason and eventually won the 2011 World Series over the Texas Rangers.

Hamilton was optioned to Triple-A to begin the 2012 season and was released from the Cardinals organization on August 18, 2012.

Boston Red Sox
On January 4, 2013 Hamilton signed a minor league deal with the Boston Red Sox that included an invitation to spring training. Hamilton was optioned to the Triple-A Pawtucket Red Sox to begin the 2013 season.

Atlanta Braves
In December 2013, Hamilton signed a minor league contract with the Atlanta Braves that included an invitation to spring training. He was released on July 26, 2014.

Post-playing career
Following his retirement, Hamilton returned to Tulane to complete his bachelor's degree in neuroscience. He attended the Hofstra Northwell School of Medicine. Due to the COVID-19 pandemic in the United States, Hamilton and the class of 2020 at the Donald and Barbara Zucker School of Medicine at Hofstra/Northwell were permitted to graduate early. Hamilton began his residency at Long Island Jewish Medical Center, specializing in interventional radiology.

References

External links

Hamilton player profile page at Scout.com

1984 births
Living people
St. Louis Cardinals players
Tulane Green Wave baseball players
Swing of the Quad Cities players
State College Spikes players
Palm Beach Cardinals players
Springfield Cardinals players
Memphis Redbirds players
Pawtucket Red Sox players
Baseball players from Baltimore
Major League Baseball first basemen
Falmouth Commodores players
Hofstra University alumni
Algodoneros de Guasave players
American expatriate baseball players in Mexico
Gulf Coast Cardinals players
Gulf Coast Red Sox players
Gigantes del Cibao players
American expatriate baseball players in the Dominican Republic
Gwinnett Braves players
Mesa Solar Sox players
Naranjeros de Hermosillo players